Chaturanga (Bengali: চতুরঙ্গ; English: Quartet) is a novel by Rabindranath Tagore, widely considered a landmark in Bengali literature. The novel was published in 1916.
The story of the novel follows the journey of a young man named Sreebilas (the narrator), his meeting with his best friend, philosopher and guide Sachis, the story of Damini a widow and Jyathamoshai, an idealist person.

The novel consists of four chapters, each named for these main characters of the novel.
Thus named Chaturanga, which in Sanskrit means "four parts", a "quartet".

In 2008, Chaturanga film was released, based on this novel.

References

External links 

 rabindra-rachanabali.nltr.org (Bengali)

Novels by Rabindranath Tagore
1916 novels
Indian Bengali-language novels